is a Japanese former professional baseball player who is currently a coach for the Tohoku Rakuten Golden Eagles of the Nippon Professional Baseball(NPB). He previously played for the Yokohama BayStars/Yokohama DeNA BayStars and Saitama Seibu Lions of the NPB.

Career

On April 7, 2007, Watanabe made his NPB debut.

On October 14, 2019, Watanabe become playing batting coach for the Tohoku Rakuten Golden Eagles of NPB.

On September 12, 2020, Watanabe announced his retirement after the season, and next day he held press conference.

References

External links

1980 births
Living people
Baseball people from Ibaraki Prefecture
Japanese baseball coaches
Japanese baseball players
Nippon Professional Baseball coaches
Saitama Seibu Lions players
Tohoku Rakuten Golden Eagles players
Yokohama BayStars players
Yokohama DeNA BayStars players